Neyssa Etienne (born 31 October 1983) is a retired Haitian female tennis player.

In her career, she won one singles title and two doubles titles on the ITF Circuit. On 15 September 2003, she reached her best singles ranking of world No. 397. On 7 October 2002, she peaked at No. 492 in the doubles rankings.

Playing for Haiti at the Fed Cup, Etienne has a win–loss record of 8–5.

Career
Etienne had a successful junior career, winning five singles and 14 doubles ITF titles. Her career-high singles junior ranking was world No. 25, high doubles junior ranking world No. 5. She finished her junior career with a win–loss record of 186–87.

ITF Circuit finals

Singles: 4 (1 title, 3 runner-ups)

Doubles: 4 (2 titles, 2 runner-ups)

Junior Grand Slam finals

Girls' doubles: 1 (runner-up)

References

External links
 
 
 

1983 births
Living people
Haitian female tennis players
Olympic tennis players of Haiti
Sportspeople from Port-au-Prince
Tennis players at the 2000 Summer Olympics
Central American and Caribbean Games bronze medalists for Haiti
Competitors at the 2002 Central American and Caribbean Games
Central American and Caribbean Games medalists in tennis